Mavhungu Maureen Lerule-Ramakhanya is a South African politician. A member of the African National Congress, Lerule-Ramakhanya is a former mayor of the Vhembe District Municipality. She was elected as a Member of the Limpopo Provincial Legislature in May 2019. She was then elected as the speaker of the legislature. In March 2020, Lerule-Ramakhanya was appointed as the Member of the Executive Council (MEC) for Transport and Community Safety. She was moved to the Education portfolio of the executive council in June 2022.

Political career
Lerule-Ramakhanya is a long-standing member the African National Congress. She took office as mayor of the Makhado Local Municipality on 1 December 2008, succeeding Glory Mashaba. In April 2012, the ANC provincial executive committee resolved to remove three mayors. The party reasoned that poor service delivery was behind its decision. Lerule-Ramakhanya was one of the three and she stepped down as mayor on 22 April. Farisani Mutavhatsindi was appointed as her successor.

On 14 December 2018, Lerule-Ramakhanya was elected mayor of the Vhembe District Municipality. She succeeded Florence Radzilani, who resigned following her involvement in the VBS Mutual Bank controversy. She was sworn in by High Court Judge Frans Kgomo on the same day.

For the provincial election that was held on 8 May 2019, Lerule-Ramakhanya was placed 13th on the party's provincial list. She was elected to the Limpopo Provincial Legislature as the ANC won 38 seats. She was sworn in as an MPL on 22 May 2019. The ANC selected her as their candidate for speaker, and she was elected.

On 23 March 2020, premier Stanley Mathabatha appointed Lerule-Ramakhanya as the Member of the Executive Council responsible for the provincial Department of Transport and Community Safety, succeeding Dickson Masemola. The changes came into effect on the same day. Rosemary Molapo succeeded her as speaker of the legislature.

On 29 June 2022, Mathabatha conducted a reshuffle of his executive, in which he moved Lerule-Ramakhanya to the Education portfolio and appointed the outgoing Education MEC Polly Boshielo as the new MEC for Transport and Community Safety.

Personal life
Lerule-Ramakhanya married Happy Ramakhanya in July 2011.

References

External links

Living people
Year of birth missing (living people)
People from Limpopo
21st-century South African politicians
21st-century South African women politicians
African National Congress politicians
Members of the Limpopo Provincial Legislature
Women members of provincial legislatures of South Africa